Thundering Hoofs is a 1922 American silent drama film directed by Francis Ford and starring Ford, Peggy O'Day and James T. Kelley. Made as an independent, it was directed by Francis Ford who was the elder brother of the better-known John Ford. Copies of the film still survive, unlike many independent productions of the era.

Synopsis
After years at a boarding school, a young woman returns to Kentucky. She arrives just in time to stop a racehorse she owns from being scratched from the Kentucky Derby.

Cast
 Peggy O'Day as Betty
 Francis Ford as Daddy Bill/'Colonel' Bill
 James T. Kelley as 	Jimmy O'Brien
 Florence Murth as 	Bill's Sister
 Philip Ford as Jack - Bill's Nephew 
 Cecil McLean as Jack's Sweetheart - Betty's Chum

References

Bibliography
 Munden, Kenneth White. The American Film Institute Catalog of Motion Pictures Produced in the United States, Part 1. University of California Press, 1997.

External links
 

1922 films
1922 drama films
1920s English-language films
American silent feature films
Silent American drama films
Films directed by Francis Ford
Films set in Kentucky
American horse racing films
1920s American films